is the first album by the Japanese rock band Glay. It was released on May 25, 1994, by the independent label Extasy Records and peaked at #57 on the Oricon chart, with more than 51,000 copies sold.

Overview
As an unsigned band, Glay promoted themselves by handing out flyers on the streets of Tokyo and giving out demo tapes. Eventually, hide of X Japan gave one of their demos to his bandmate Yoshiki. During an October 1993 show, Yoshiki and his entourage came to watch and offered the band a contract to his record label Extasy Records.

The drums on Hai to Diamond were performed by Akira, who left the group in January before its release. Although "Rain" was written and demoed under the title "Julia (Reason For So Long)" prior to this album, the finished version includes lyrics and co-composition by Yoshiki. It and the other singles, "Manatsu no Tobira" and "Kanojo no "Modern..."", were all re-recorded for their second album Speed Pop.

"Manatsu no Tobira" was used in the 1994 anime Yamato Takeru. It was also covered by v[Neu] for the compilation album Counteraction - V-Rock covered Visual Anime songs Compilation-, which was released on May 23, 2012 and features covers of songs by visual kei bands that were used in anime. "Kanojo no "Modern..."" was covered for Crush! 3 - 90's V-Rock Best Hit Cover Love Songs-, which was released on June 27, 2012 and features current visual kei bands covering love songs by visual kei bands of the 90's. It was performed by Crash49, a one-off supergroup consisting of Mitsu from v[Neu], Yoshihiro from Guild, Aki from -OZ-, Karin from Nogod and Hiroki from D.

In celebration of their 20th anniversary, Glay released  exactly 20 years later on May 25, 2014. The two CD/one DVD set includes remastered tracks, re-recordings, demo versions, and a live medley.

Track listing 
All tracks written and composed by Takuro except track 5, written by Yoshiki and composed by Takuro and Yoshiki.
 "" - 5:19
 "" - 4:40
 "Kissin' Noise" - 4:50
 "" - 6:07
 "Rain (Glay Version)" - 6:45
 "Lady Close" - 4:48
 "Two Bell Silence" - 4:09
 "" - 5:03
 "Burst" - 3:21
 "" - 4:45

Personnel 
Teru - vocals
Takuro - electric guitar, acoustic guitar
Hisashi - electric guitar
Jiro - bass guitar
Akira - drums
Mr. Kitaguchi - keyboards
Makoto - keyboards
Takuya Kon - violin
Naoki Ichikawa - piano on track 5

References 

 Hai to Diamond page at Oricon

External links 
 Glay official web site

Glay albums
1994 debut albums
Extasy Records albums